Hugo Fraile Martínez (born 16 March 1987) is a Spanish professional footballer who plays as a right winger.

Club career
Fraile was in Huelva, Andalusia. After graduating from Atlético Madrid's youth system, he made his debut as a senior with its C side in 2005, in Tercera División.

Fraile moved to Rayo Vallecano in the summer of 2006, being assigned to the reserves also in the fourth level. On 3 September 2008 he made his first-team debut, coming on as a substitute in a 3–1 away win against SD Huesca in the second round of the Copa del Rey.

On 19 July 2011, Fraile joined another reserve team, Getafe CF B of Segunda División B. He made his debut with the main squad on 5 May of the following year, playing the last 13 minutes in a 0–0 La Liga away draw against Athletic Bilbao.

On 18 May 2012, Fraile was definitely promoted to the first team. After appearing rarely during the season, he was transferred to Segunda División club Sporting de Gijón, signing a two-year deal.

Fraile scored his first professional goal on 1 September 2013, the first in a 3–0 home win over RCD Mallorca. On 27 January 2016 he terminated his contract with Sporting, and agreed to a two-and-a-half-year deal with Elche CF the following day.

On 8 July 2017, following his team's relegation, Fraile joined third-tier club CF Fuenlabrada for one year. After achieving promotion in his second season as champions, he scored a career-best 13 times in the following for an eighth-place finish, ten of those coming from penalties.

Fraile signed with AD Alcorcón of the second division on 22 August 2020.

References

External links

LaLiga profile

1987 births
Living people
Spanish footballers
Footballers from Huelva
Association football wingers
La Liga players
Segunda División players
Segunda División B players
Tercera División players
Atlético Madrid C players
Rayo Vallecano B players
Rayo Vallecano players
Getafe CF B players
Getafe CF footballers
Sporting de Gijón players
Elche CF players
CF Fuenlabrada footballers
AD Alcorcón footballers